Antoinette Clinton (born September 29, 1985), known by her stage name Butterscotch, is an American beatboxer, singer, and musician.

Early career 
Butterscotch learned to play the piano at an early age as her mother was a piano teacher. Her siblings all played the piano plus one other instrument trumpet, cello, trombone, clarinet; Clinton had access to all these instruments.
As Butterscotch grew older, she was exposed to beat boxing by her high school friends, and was inspired to learn the skill, adopting the stage name "Butterscotch" which originated from a song Antoinette wrote in high school. 
She attended Natomas Charter School's Performing and Fine Arts Academy in Sacramento, California, where she focused on music.

America's Got Talent
Butterscotch gained national exposure in 2007 when she appeared on the second season of America's Got Talent.  She both sang and beatboxed, as well as a combination of the two while playing the piano, for her performances.  The judges passed Butterscotch through several episodes and she was voted back by the viewers several times.  She was in the final four (the last stage of the competition before the winner is announced), before being voted out by the viewers on the show which aired August 20, 2007. A number of videos with Butterscotch have gained wide popularity on YouTube.

Performances/results

References

External links

State Hornet article

1985 births
America's Got Talent contestants
American women pianists
Living people
Singers from California
People from Davis, California
African-American guitarists
American beatboxers
Davis Senior High School (California) alumni
21st-century American guitarists
21st-century American saxophonists
Guitarists from California
21st-century American women singers
21st-century American pianists
21st-century American women guitarists
20th-century African-American women singers
African-American pianists
Beatbox Battle World Champion
21st-century African-American women singers